Andre Bruyns (19 September 1946 – 14 April 2022) was a South African cricketer. He played in 90 first-class matches between 1965 and 1977.

References

External links
 

1946 births
2022 deaths
South African cricketers
KwaZulu-Natal cricketers
Western Province cricketers
Cricketers from Pietermaritzburg